We Are the Dead may refer to:

 "We are the Dead", the opening words of the second stanza of "In Flanders Fields", a poem written during the First World War
 "We are the dead", a phrase uttered by Winston and echoed by Julia in George Orwell's Nineteen Eighty-Four
 We Are the Dead (album), by Antagonist A.D.
 "We Are the Dead" (song), by David Bowie

See also
 We the Living (disambiguation)